Bastard Of The Blues is the thirteenth studio album by Canadian band Helix, released May 5, 2014.

Reception
Reception of the album has been mostly positive.
BraveWords gave it a positive review, stating that "Although Bastard Of The Blues has its faults, Vollmer & Co. continue to crank out new tunes after 40 years." The online magazine My Global Mind gave it a decent review, mentioning that it's "rather flat and lacking much to keep the listener interested. And the songs are somewhat redundant, each having the same basic vibe." Despite being inconsistent and lacking a punch, they did praise vocalist Brian Vollmer's voice as "perfectly suited for this kind of sound", and lead guitarist Brent Doerner's solos were "top-notch."

Track listing

Personnel
Helix
 Brian Vollmer - vocals
 Daryl Gray - bass
 Greg "Fritz" Hinz - drums
 Chris Julke - guitars
 Kaleb "Duckman" Duck - guitars

References

External links
Bastard of the Blues

Helix (band) albums
2014 albums